Christine Muessiggang (born 12 December 1979) is an Austrian bobsledder who has competed since 2002. Her best Bobsleigh World Cup finish was 15th in the two-woman event at Cortina d'Ampezzo in January 2008.

References

External links

1979 births
Austrian female bobsledders
Living people
Place of birth missing (living people)
21st-century Austrian women